This is the discography for Cape Verdean morna musician Cesária Évora.

Albums

Studio albums

Posthumous albums

Compilation albums

Live albums

Singles

Special appearances 
2002 - Lágrimas Negras with Compay Segundo
2003 - Drop the Debt
2004 - Elle chante, with Bernard Lavilliers in the album Carnets de bord
2005 - Elle chante, with Bernard Lavilliers in the album Escale au Grand Rex
2007 - Quitte à t'aimer, with Hocus Pocus in the album Place 54
2008 - Petites îles with Nég' Marrons in the album Les Liens sacrés
2009 - Crepuscolare solitudine, with Gianni Morandi
2009 - Ricordo d'Infanzia, with Gigi d'Alessio
2010 - La voce dell'Amore, with Ron

References 

Electronic music discographies